Dark Passage is a 1947 American mystery thriller film directed by Delmer Daves and starring Humphrey Bogart and Lauren Bacall. The film is based on the 1946 novel of the same title by David Goodis. It was the third of four films real-life couple Bacall and Bogart made together.

The first portion of the film subjectively depicts the male lead's point of view, concealing the face of Vincent Parry (Bogart), until the character undergoes plastic surgery to change his appearance. The story follows Parry's attempt to hide from the law and clear his name of murder.

Plot

Vincent Parry (Bogart), convicted of killing his wife, escapes from San Quentin Prison and evades police by hitching a ride with a motorist named Baker. Already suspicious of Parry's appearance, Baker hears a radio news report about an escaped convict; Parry resorts to beating him unconscious. An apparent stranger, Irene Jansen (Bacall), picks Parry up and smuggles him past a police roadblock into San Francisco. She offers him shelter in her apartment while she goes to buy him some new clothes.
Irene's acquaintance Madge comes by Irene's apartment, but Parry (through a closed door) tells her to leave. A former romantic interest whom Parry had spurned, Madge testified at his trial out of spite, claiming that his dying wife identified him as the killer. Irene explains that she had followed Parry's case with interest and that she believes Parry is innocent. Her own father had been falsely convicted of murder, and since then she has taken an interest in miscarriages of justice.

Parry leaves but is recognized by his cab driver, Sam, who turns out to be sympathetic and gives Parry the name of a plastic surgeon who can change his appearance. Parry arranges to stay with a friend, George Fellsinger, during his recuperation from the surgery.
Later, Parry enters George's apartment to find him murdered; he sentimentally handles George's trumpet before leaving. He retreats to Irene's apartment; she nurses him back to health.
Irene is called on by Madge and her ex-fiancé Bob, who is romantically interested in Irene. While Parry hides in the bedroom, Madge asks to stay with Irene for protection, worried that Parry will kill her for testifying against him. As Irene insists that Madge leave, the latter unwittingly reveals that Irene recently had a male guest, thinking the voice she heard through the door was Bob's. Bob departs as well, having learned that Irene has another romantic interest.
Parry recuperates and learns that he is wanted for George's murder, his fingerprints having been found on the murder weapon, George's trumpet. After his bandages are removed, Parry reluctantly parts from Irene.

Parry decides to flee the city before trying to discover who really killed his wife. At a diner, an undercover policeman becomes suspicious of Parry's behavior. The policeman asks for identification, but Parry claims to have left it at his hotel. On the street, Parry darts in front of a moving car to escape. At the hotel, Parry is surprised by Baker, who holds him at gunpoint. Baker has been following Parry since they first met. He now demands that Irene pay him $60,000 or he will turn Parry over to the law. Parry agrees, and Baker obliges him to drive the two of them to Irene's apartment. Claiming to take a shortcut, Parry drives to a secluded spot underneath the Golden Gate Bridge, where he succeeds in disarming Baker and questions him, becoming convinced that Madge is behind the deaths of his wife and friend. The two men fight, and Baker falls to his death.

Parry goes to Madge's apartment. Knowing she does not recognize him with his new face, he pretends to be a friend of Bob's and feigns interest in courting her. Parry soon reveals his true identity and accuses Madge of having killed both his wife and George. He shows her that he has all the accusations written down, and attempts to coerce her into making a confession. She refuses, and plunges through a window to her death.
Knowing he cannot prove his innocence, and that he will likely be accused of Madge's murder as well, Parry decides to flee. He phones Irene, revealing his plans to relocate to South America; she says she will meet him there. Later, Parry waits with a drink in a beach bar in Peru. Irene arrives, and they embrace on the dance floor.

Cast

 Humphrey Bogart as Vincent Parry
 Lauren Bacall as Irene Jansen
 Bruce Bennett as Bob
 Agnes Moorehead as Madge Rapf
 Tom D'Andrea as Cabby (Sam)
 Clifton Young as Baker
 Douglas Kennedy as Detective Kennedy in Diner
 Rory Mallinson as George Fellsinger
 Houseley Stevenson as Dr. Walter Coley
 John Arledge as Lonely Man (uncredited)
 Frank Wilcox as Vincent Parry (picture in the newspaper, uncredited)

Production
Warner Bros. paid author David Goodis $25,000 for the rights to the story, which had originally been serialized in The Saturday Evening Post from July 20 to September 7, 1946, before being published in book form. Bogart himself had read the book and wanted to make it into a movie. At the time that Dark Passage was shot, Bogart was the best-paid actor in Hollywood, averaging $450,000 a year.

Robert Montgomery had made the film Lady in the Lake (1946) which also uses a "subjective camera" technique, in which the viewer sees the action through the protagonist's eyes. This technique was used in 1927 in France by Abel Gance for Napoléon and by the director Rouben Mamoulian for the first five minutes of Dr. Jekyll and Mr. Hyde (1931). Film critic Hal Erikson believes Dark Passage does a better job at using this point-of-view technique, writing, "The first hour or so of Dark Passage does the same thing—and the results are far more successful than anything seen in Montgomery's film."

According to Bacall, in her autobiography By Myself, during the filming of Dark Passage, Bogart's hair began to fall out in clumps, the result of alopecia areata, although photos from their 1945 wedding show Bogart to be losing his hair two years earlier.  By the end of filming he wore a full wig.  Bogart eventually had B12 shots and other treatments to counteract the effects, but he was helped by the fact that in his next film, The Treasure of the Sierra Madre he was required to wear a full wig.

Filming locations
Parts of the film were filmed on location in San Francisco, California, including the Filbert Steps and the cable car system. The elegant Streamline Moderne Malloch Building on Telegraph Hill was used for the apartment of Irene Jansen where Parry hides out and recuperates from his surgery. Apartment Number 10 was Jansen's. The current residents of that apartment occasionally place a cutout of Bogart in the window. The diner was "Harry's Wagon" at 1921 Post Street, a long-closed diner in the Fillmore District of San Francisco.

Reception

Critical response 
Film critic Bosley Crowther gave the film a mixed review and was not impressed by Bogart's performance but was impressed by Bacall's work. He wrote:

He made the case that the best part of the film is:

On Rotten Tomatoes the film holds an approval rating of 90% based on 31 reviews, with an average rating of 7.7/10. Metacritic assigned the film a weighted average score of 68 out of 100, based on 10 critics, indicating "generally favorable reviews".

Box office
The film earned $2.31 million domestically and $1.11 million in overseas markets, for a worldwide total of $3.4 million.

See also
 The Man with Bogart's Face

References

External links

 
 
 
 
 Dark Passage trailer at Spike TV

1947 films
1947 crime films
1940s crime thriller films
1940s mystery thriller films
American black-and-white films
American crime thriller films
American mystery thriller films
1940s English-language films
Film noir
Films about miscarriage of justice
Films based on American crime novels
Films based on mystery novels
Films directed by Delmer Daves
Films scored by Franz Waxman
Films set in San Francisco
Films set in San Quentin State Prison
Films shot from the first-person perspective
Films shot in San Francisco
Murder mystery films
Warner Bros. films
Works about plastic surgery
1940s American films